Skogskyrkogården Chapel is a chapel in Karlskoga Municipality in Sweden. It is bordered by an esker to the west and by the Karlskoga city center to the south and east. 

The chapel building was designed by Lars Bäckvall and completed in 1908. It is heritage listed by the Swedish National Heritage Board.

References

External links 

 

20th-century Church of Sweden church buildings
Churches in Örebro County
Chapels in Sweden
Churches in the Diocese of Karlstad

Buildings and structures in Karlskoga Municipality
Listed buildings in Sweden